Megachile saba is a species of bee in the family Megachilidae. It was described by Strand in 1914.

References

Saba
Insects described in 1914